New Englanders are the inhabitants of the New England region in the Northeastern United States. Beginning with the New England Colonies, the name "New Englander" refers to those who live in the six New England states or those with cultural or family ties to the region. Originally inhabited by Algonquin American Indians, including tribes Abenakis, Mi'kmaq, Penobscot, Pequots, Mohegans, Narragansetts, Pocumtucks, and Wampanoag. The region was first settled by European colonists from the Mayflower as part of the Plymouth Company in 1620. 
The region has seen many different waves of immigration since 1620, creating a unique and diverse culture. New Englanders have played a prominent role in the colonial and modern history of the United States, from political dynasties to influential artists and writers. Famous for their distinct dialect and attitude, New Englanders hold a strong regional identity and a distinct history and culture within the United States.

Terminology
The region was named "New England" by English explorer John Smith in 1616. While the term "New Englander" can refer to anyone who resides in New England or has cultural ties to the region, the term "Native New Englander" refers to those New Englanders who were born in the region.

Another term to refer to those who live in New England is "Yankee". Depending on the context Yankee may refer to all Americans in general, but in the colloquial American context, it refers to those who live in the Northeastern United States and even more specifically New England. Originally employed to describe New Englanders with ancestral roots to the original English settlers, the term has evolved throughout American history to have a variety of contextual meanings.

See also
Swamp Yankee
Old Stock Americans
Acadians
Cuisine of New England

References

Regions of the United States
New England